Rick Kruijs, commonly known as Rick Kruys, (born 9 May 1985) is a Dutch professional football manager and former player who is the head coach of Eerste Divisie club VVV-Venlo. His father, Gert Kruys is also a former professional footballer and current manager.

Club career

Utrecht
Kruys started his professional career in Utrecht in 2003. He played in Utrecht for five years and played over 100 league games. In 2008 Dutch media reported that Kruys would sign a -year contract with Malmö FF, and he eventually joined the team in July 2008.

Malmö FF
Due to injury problems Kruys would only play four games for his first season at the club. In 2009 Kruys played 13 games for the club in his best season this far at the club although still battling injuries. For the 2010 league winning season Kruys once again had much problems with injuries and played only four games. In early 2011 Malmö FF gave Kruys permission to look for a new club to restart his career.

FC Volendam
Kruys was eventually loaned to FC Volendam until 1 June 2011. When the loan deal expired Kruys returned to Malmö, but was not included in the squad as the club was awaiting eventual bids from clubs in the Netherlands. On 19 July it was announced that Kruys would continue to play for Volendam on loan until the end of the season.

Excelsior
Kruys signed a two year contract with Excelsior on 13 July 2012. He was part of Excelsior's promotion to the Eredivisie in the 2013–14 season. He made 122 appearances for the club, scoring five goals, and he announced his retirement from professional football on 7 February 2016.

International career
Kruys has represented the Dutch under-21 side for 16 games and scored one goal.

Coaching career
During the 2013–14 season, Kruys was working as an individual coach for the academy of FC Utrecht alongside his playing career at Excelsior. He then left the position in 2014 and started working as a youth coach and assistant manager at VV De Meern, still playing for SBV Excelsior beside. Kruys left SBV Excelsior in 2016 and continued at VV De Meern, now also as player and he was later also hired as a youth coach at FC Utrecht again.

Retiring from playing football at the end of 2017, Kruys became an assistant coach at FC Utrecht in January 2018, alongside his former coach Marinus Dijkhuizen and under head coach Jean-Paul de Jong. In May 2018, Kruys signed a new deal until the summer 2023 with Utrecht. After de Jong was fired in September 2018, Kruys and Dijkhuizen was appointed joint-caretaker managers. They were replaced later on the month and Kruys continued as an assistant manager.

Managerial career
On 16 June 2022, VVV-Venlo appointed Kruys as head coach on a two-year deal, effective from 1 July 2022, replacing Jos Luhukay.

Honours
Utrecht
Johan Cruyff Shield: 2004

Footnotes

External links
 Profile at Voetbal International 
 Profile at Malmö FF 
 

1985 births
Living people
Dutch footballers
Netherlands under-21 international footballers
Netherlands youth international footballers
Dutch expatriate footballers
Association football midfielders
Eredivisie players
Eerste Divisie players
Derde Divisie players
FC Utrecht players
Footballers from Utrecht (city)
Allsvenskan players
Malmö FF players
FC Volendam players
Excelsior Rotterdam players
Expatriate footballers in Sweden
USV Elinkwijk players
Dutch football managers
FC Utrecht non-playing staff
VVV-Venlo managers
Eerste Divisie managers
Dutch expatriate sportspeople in Sweden